Mopaliidae is a family of marine molluscs in the class Polyplacophora.

Genera
There are 10 recognized genera:
 Amicula Gray, 1847
 Dendrochiton Berry, 1911
 Gallardochiton Sirenko, 2007
 Katharina Gray, 1847
 Mopalia Gray, 1847
 Mopaliella Thiele, 1909
 Nuttallochiton Plate, 1899
 Placiphorella Dall, 1879
 Placiphorina Kaas & Van Belle, 1994
 Plaxiphora Gray, 1847 (synonym Maorichiton Iredale, 1914)

References

 
Mollusc families
Chitons
Taxa named by William Healey Dall